The GWF Tag Team Championship was the tag team title in the Global Wrestling Federation in Texas. The title existed from 1991 until 1994, when GWF closed. The title was featured on the promotion's show that aired nationally on ESPN. It is known as the first tag team title that Harlem Heat won. In its early days, the GWF pretended on television that it was part of a larger worldwide promotion. In 1991, it was announced that a tag team known as the "English lords" had been injured in a car wreck and that the GWF was organizing a tournament to award the vacated title in Dallas. No such team as the English Lords ever existed.

Title history

Tournaments

1991
The GWF Tag Team Championship Tournament was a twenty-four man tournament for the inaugural GWF Tag Team Championship held on July 26 and July 27, 1991. Steve Simpson and Chris Walker defeated Rip Rogers and Scotty Anthony in the final to win the tournament.

See also
 Global Wrestling Federation

Notes

References

Global Wrestling Federation championships
Tag team wrestling championships